Battle of Orléans may refer to:
 Battle of Orleans (463)
 Siege of Orléans of the Hundred Years' War
 Second Battle of Orléans (1870) or Battle of Vaumainbert
 Attack on Orleans of World War I

See also
 Battle of New Orleans (disambiguation)